Lyrical Nitrate is a 1991 collage film by Peter Delpeut.

Summary
The film consists of clips from various silent films printed on decaying nitrate film stock, including shorts, documentaries, and travelogues.  There is no formal narrative. Delpeut followed the film with 1993's The Forbidden Quest, which also uses found footage; the two were released together on video and DVD.

Production
The films were drawn from the Desmets Collection of the Nederlands Filmmuseum, where Delpeut worked as deputy director for a decade. Jean Desmet (1875–1956) was an early Dutch film distributor. After Desmet's death a cache of film prints was discovered in the attic of a theater he owned in Amsterdam, and subsequently added to the museum's collection.

See also
Decasia, a similar non-narrative, found-footage film.
The Forbidden Quest, Delpeut's unofficial sequel to Lyrical Nitrate.
Lost film

Notes

External links

MUBI
Chicago Reader Review

1991 films
Dutch avant-garde and experimental films
Collage film
1990s avant-garde and experimental films